Renin-e Bozorg (also Romanized as Renīn-e Bozorg; also known as Renīn-e Shams od Dīn) is a village in Gowharan Rural District, Gowharan District, Bashagard County, Hormozgan Province, Iran. At the 2006 census, its population was 251, in 60 families.

References 

Populated places in Bashagard County